Jin Yun Qiao or Chin Yun Ch'iao (金雲翹 or 金雲翹傳, The Tale of Jin, Yun and Qiao or The Tale of Chin, Yun, and Ch'iao) is a seventeenth-century Chinese novel by an anonymous writer known only by the pseudonym Qingxin Cairen (青心才人, Pure Heart Talented Man). The tale is widely known in Vietnam where it was read as a Chữ Nho text under the Vietnamese pronunciation of Chinese characters as "Kim Vân Kiều," and then became the original Chinese-language source on which the Vietnamese epic poem The Tale of Kieu is based.

References

17th-century Chinese novels